55th Armoured Regiment is part of the Armoured Corps of the Indian Army. 
The present Colonel of the regiment is  Lieutenant General Ajai Singh, AVSM.

The Regiment had the honour of participating in the Republic Day parade in 2014 with their T-90 tanks.

The motto of the regiment is युद्धाय दृढ़ निश्चय (Yudhyay Dridh Nishchay), which translates to ‘Into Battle with Resolve’.

References

Armoured and cavalry regiments of the Indian Army from 1947